Elena Arifova  (born ) is a retired Azerbaijani female volleyball player. She was part of the Azerbaijan women's national volleyball team.

She participated in the 1994 FIVB Volleyball Women's World Championship. On club level she played with Neffyag Baku.

Clubs
 Neffyag Baku (1994)

References

1972 births
Living people
Azerbaijani women's volleyball players
Place of birth missing (living people)